Space Base Delta 2 (SBD 2) is a garrison command in the United States Space Force, responsible providing installation support functions for the resident air operations, space-based missile warning capabilities, space surveillance operations, and space communications missions at Buckley Space Force Base, Cape Cod Space Force Station, Cavalier Space Force Station, and Clear Space Force Station. It also provides airmen and space professionals that deploy and are deployed in-place, to support combatant commanders in order to accomplish warfighting missions globally.

The delta hosts six major base partners: Delta 4 (Missile Warning Delta), 140th Wing, Colorado Air National Guard (COANG); the Navy Operational Support Center; the Aerospace Data Facility-Colorado; the Army Aviation Support Facility and the Air Reserve Personnel Center. Formerly the 2d Space Wing, it was redesignated as Buckley Garrison on 24 July 2020. Eventually, Buckley Garrison will be redesignated as Space Base Delta 2.

Its current commander is Colonel Marcus D. Jackson.

Structure 
The garrison is composed of the following units:
 460th Civil Engineer Squadron (460 CES)
460th Contracting Squadron (460 CONS)
460th Force Support Squadron (460 FSS)
460th Logistics Readiness Squadron (460 LRS)
 460th Security Forces Squadron (460 SFS)
SBD 2 Information Technology Flight (SBD 2/ITF)
 460th Medical Group (460 MDG)
460th Healthcare Operations Squadron (45 HCOS)
460th Operational Medical Readiness Squadron (45 OMRS)
 460th Comptroller Squadron (460 CPTS)

List of commanders

References 

Deltas of the United States Space Force